McCardle is a surname. Notable people with the surname include:

Carl McCardle (1904–1972), American journalist and public official, Assistant Secretary of State for Public Affairs (1953–1957)
Eliza McCardle Johnson (1810–1876), wife of President Andrew Johnson
Fred McCardle, Canadian politician, member of the Legislative Assembly of Prince Edward Island (2003–2007)
Peter McCardle (born 1955), New Zealand politician
William Wilson McCardle (1844–1922), member of the New Zealand Legislative Council

See also
Ex parte McCardle, United States Supreme Court case
McArdle